Mikutavičius is the masculine form of a Lithuanian family name. Its feminine forms  are: Mikutavičienė (married woman or widow) and Mikutavičiūtė (unmarried woman).

Surname
The surname may refer to:
Marijonas Mikutavičius (b. 1971) – singer, journalist
Ričardas Mikutavičius (1935-1998) – Catholic priest, poet and art collectionist
Jonas Mikutavičius – organist, choirmaster
Juozas Mikutavičius – educator, conductor, choirmaster

Lithuanian-language surnames